Camenca may refer to:

Camenca, a town in Transnistria, Moldova
Camenca, Glodeni, a commune in Glodeni District, Moldova
Camenca, a village in Brusturoasa Commune, Bacău County, Romania
Camenca, the Romanian name for Kamyanka, Chernivtsi Oblast, Ukraine
Camenca (Prut), a river in Moldova, tributary of the Prut
Camenca (Trotuș), a river in Romania, tributary of the Trotuș